Max & Co is a 2007 stop-motion animated feature film released in Belgium, France, and Switzerland in February 2008. It won the Audience Award at the 2007 Annecy International Animated Film Festival. With its budget of CHF 30 million (€18.6 million), of which CHF 1.5 million were subsidised by the Swiss Federal Office of Culture, it was the most expensive Swiss film ever.

Plot
15-year-old fox Max sets off for Saint-Hilare in search of his father, the famous troubadour Johnny Bigoude, who disappeared shortly before Max's birth. He is waylaid by Sam, a rascally fairground entertainer, and introduced to the delights of the amazing Fly Swatter Festival. When Max finally gets there, Saint-Hilaire turns out to be the private kingdom of Bzzz & Co., infamous manufacturers of flyswatters, run by the degenerate frog Rodolfo. Musical virtuoso Max makes a big impression, especially on the smart, lovely, resourceful mouse Felicie, who convinces Rodolfo to hire him.

Cast
 Lorant Deutsch as Max
 Stéphane Sanseverino as Sam
 Virginie Efira as Cathy
 Amélie Lerma as Felicie
 Patrick Bouchitey as Rodolfo
 Denis Podalydès as Martin
 Micheline Dax as Doudou
 Mathias Mlekuz as Bobole
 François Levantal as Bernard
 Bernard Ballet as Marcel

Reception
Although well-received critically, the "anti-capitalist ecological fable" was a commercial failure. Only 16,000 tickets were sold instead of the projected 110,000, and the production companies filed for bankruptcy in August 2008.

See also
List of animated feature-length films
List of stop-motion films

References

External links
 
 

2007 films
2007 animated films
French animated films
Swiss animated films
Swiss children's films
British animated films
2000s stop-motion animated films
Belgian animated films
2000s French-language films
French-language Swiss films
French-language Belgian films
2000s British films
2000s French films